Wucheng is a district of the city of Jinhua, Zhejiang province, China.

Administrative divisions
Subdistricts:
Chengdong Subdistrict (城东街道), Chengzhong Subdistrict (城中街道), Chengxi Subdistrict (城西街道), Chengbei Subdistrict (城北街道), Jiangnan Subdistrict (江南街道), Xiguan Subdistrict (西关街道), Qiubin Subdistrict (秋滨街道), Xinshi Subdistrict (新狮街道), Sanjiangkou Subdistrict (三江口街道)

Towns:
Luodian (罗店镇), Jiangtang (蒋堂镇), Tangxi (汤溪镇), Luobu (罗埠镇), Yafan (雅畈镇), Langya (琅琊镇), Yangbu (洋埠镇), Andi (安地镇), Bailongqiao (白龙桥镇)

Townships:
Sumeng Township (苏孟乡), Zhuma Township (竹马乡), Qianxi Township (乾西乡), Changshan Township (长山乡), Xinfan Township (莘畈乡), Ruoyang Township (箬阳乡), Shafan Township (沙畈乡), Tashi Township (塔石乡), Lingshang Township (岭上乡)

See also
Shangjing, a village in Tangxi Town, Wucheng District

References

 
Districts of Zhejiang
Geography of Jinhua